Community currencies that have been used in the United States:

Models
 Local currency
 Local Exchange Trading Systems (LETS)
 Time-based currency

Currencies

Intra-company
 The Barter Network

Interstate
 Blue Money Brattleboro, Vermont, and Chesterfield, New Hampshire
 BNI Delaware, Pennsylvania, Maryland, New Jersey
 Disney dollar Disneyland and Disney World
 Fourth Corner Exchange Pacific Northwest
 RiverHOURS Columbia River Gorge (Inactive)
 Potomacs (Started: 2009) Location: Washington, D.C., suburbs of Northern Virginia and Maryland

Currencies by State

Arkansas
Local Trade Partners (Started: 2009) hybrid between a local currency and bartering; Fayetteville, Arkansas

Arizona
 Arizona Dollars Dewey, Arizona (Inactive)
 Tucson Time Traders Tucson, Arizona

California
 Barter Bucks Concord, California
 Bay Bucks San Francisco, California
 Berkeley Barter Network Berkeley, California
 Berkeley Bread Berkeley, California
 Central Pound Clovis, California
 Davis Dollars Davis, California
 Escondido Dollars  Escondido, California
 Fairbuck Fairfax, California (2011–2016)
 Humboldt Hours Eureka, California, and Arcata, California
 Mendocino SEED Fort Bragg, California
 North Fork Shares North Fork, California
 San Luis Obispo Hours San Luis Obispo, California
 Sand Dollars Bolinas, California
 Santa Monica Hours Santa Monica, California
 Sequoia Hours Garberville, California
 Sonoma County Community Cash Santa Rosa, California
 TradeMarket Nevada City, California
 Ukiah Hours Ukiah, California

Colorado
 Butte Bucks Crested Butte, Colorado 
 Carbondale Spuds Carbondale, Colorado (Inactive)
 Community Cash Durango, Colorado (Inactive)
 NOCO Hours Fort Collins, Greeley, and Loveland, Colorado (Inactive) 
 North Fork Helping Hands Paonia, Colorado (Inactive)
 Mountain Hours Breckenridge, Colorado (2012 - Current)
 Mile High Hours Denver, Colorado (2012 - Current)
 Peak Hours Colorado Springs, Colorado (2012 - Current)

Connecticut
 Bristol Bucks Bristol, Connecticut (2021 - Current)
 Middletown Cash Middletown, Connecticut, Wesleyan University
 Thread City Bread Willimantic, Connecticut (Inactive)

Florida
 Clear Water Hours Tampa, Florida (2012 - Current) (Inactive)
 Tampanio Tampa, Florida (a proposed currency based on the BerkShares Model for Tampa, Florida and surrounding communities) (Inactive)

Georgia
 Atlanta Hours Atlanta, Georgia (Inactive)

Hawai'i
 Aloha Hours Hawaii, USA (2013 - Current)
 Kauai Barter and Trade Network Kilauea, Hawaii

Idaho
 Boise Hours Boise, Idaho (Inactive)
 Labor backed economy Boise, Idaho (Inactive)

Illinois
 White Rabbit Money (downstate Illinois)

Indiana
 BloomingHours Bloomington, Indiana

Iowa
 Wash Bucks Sioux City, Iowa

Kansas
 REAL Dollars Lawrence, Kansas (Inactive)

Kentucky
 Berea Bucks Berea, Kentucky (Inactive)

Louisiana
 Mo' Money New Orleans, Louisiana (Inactive)
US Money and BE Dollars Lafayette, Louisiana
Crescents (Started: 2004) New Orleans

Maine
 Waldo Hours Unity, Maine (Inactive)

Maryland
 Anacostia Hours Mount Rainier, Maryland (Inactive)
 Baltimore Hours Baltimore, Maryland (Inactive)
 P.E.N. Neighborhood Exchange Takoma Park, Maryland (Inactive)
 The BNote Baltimore, Maryland

Massachusetts
 Amesbury Hours Amesbury, Massachusetts (Inactive)
 BerkShares (2006) Southern Berkshires, Massachusetts
 Cape Ann Dollars Gloucester, Massachusetts (Inactive)
 Valley Dollars Greenfield, Massachusetts (Inactive)

Michigan
 Bay Bucks (started 2006) Traverse City, Michigan
 Chamber Bucks Sault Sainte Marie, Michigan
 Detroit Cheers Detroit, Michigan (Inactive)
 Hollandollars Holland, Michigan (being discontinued but honored by local chamber of commerce)

Minnesota
 Hero dollar Minneapolis, Minnesota
 Houston Bucks Houston, Minnesota

Missouri
 Chamber Bucks Maryville, Missouri
 Kansas City Barter Bucks Kansas City, Missouri (Inactive)
 Marbles Columbia, Missouri (Inactive)
 Hermann Bucks Hermann, Missouri
 Trounce Saint Louis, Missouri

Montana
 Missoula Hours Missoula, Montana (Inactive)

Nebraska
Shamrock Dollars O'Neill, Nebraska
Cozad Cash Cozad, Nebraska

Nevada
 Goldback Statewide

New Hampshire
 Shire Silver
 Goldback Statewide

New Jersey
 Duckbills (Stevens Institute of Technology). Hoboken, NJ

New Mexico
 Santa Fe Hours Santa Fe, New Mexico (Inactive)

New York
 Brooklyn Torches (underdevelopment in 2012) Brooklyn, NY
 Particle Notes Glens Falls, New York
 Hudson Valley Current Kingston, New York
Ithaca Hours (1991) Ithaca, New York
 Ithacash - Ithaca Dollars Ithaca, New York

North Carolina
 Asheville LETS Credits Asheville, North Carolina (Inactive)
 Bull City Bucks Durham, North Carolina (Inactive)
 Earthaven Leaps Earthaven Ecovillage
  Mountain Money Mars Hill, North Carolina (Inactive)
 PLENTY Pittsboro, North Carolina

Ohio
 Cuyahoga Hours Cleveland, Ohio (Inactive)
 Portage Hours Kent, Ohio (Inactive)
 Simply Hours Columbus, Ohio (Inactive)
 Summit Hours Akron, Ohio (Inactive)
 Wooster Hours Apple Creek, Ohio (Inactive)

Oklahoma
 Tulsa Hours Tulsa, Oklahoma (Inactive)

Oregon
 Bridgetown Bucks from PDX Currency Corp, Portland (Inactive)
 Cascadia Hour Exchange (1993) Portland
 Columbia Community Exchange, Columbia County
 Gorge Local Currency Cooperative, Hood River
 Jefferson Rounds, Coos, Curry, Douglas, Klamath, Lake, Jackson, and Josephine counties
 HOUR Exchange, Corvallis
 PDX Timebank, Portland
 Reedville Free Exchange, Reedville
 Xchange Stewards, Portland

Pennsylvania
 Lehigh Valley Barter Hours Bethlehem, Pennsylvania (Inactive)
 Timebank Media, an initiative of Transition Town Media. Media, Pennsylvania
 Equal Dollars (1996) Philadelphia
Downtown Dollars (Started: 2010) Ardmore
 Akio Lira Drumore, Pennsylvania

South Dakota
 Brookings Bucks Brookings, South Dakota
 Hobo Dough South Dakota State University, Brookings, South Dakota

Tennessee
 Riverbend Tokens Chattanooga, Tennessee (Inactive)

Texas
 Greyhound Bucks Taft, Texas (Inactive)
 Houston Hours Houston, Texas
 C-City Cash Colorado City, Texas

Utah
 Goldback Statewide

Vermont
 Bristol Bucks Bristol, Vermont
 Buffalo Mountain Hours Hardwick, Vermont (Inactive)
 Burlington Bread Burlington, Vermont (Inactive)
 Green Mountain Hours Montpelier, Vermont (Inactive)
 Middlebury Money Middlebury, Vermont
 Vergennes Green Vergennes, Vermont

Virginia
 Floyd Hours Floyd, Virginia (Inactive)

Washington
 Bainbridge Island Bucks Bainbridge Island, Washington (no website found—outdated?) (Inactive)
 BizX Seattle, Washington
 Timebanks of Puget Sound Kirkland, WA
 Fourth Corner Exchange Washington, Oregon, Colorado, New Mexico, Ohio, California
 Kettle River Hours Kettle Falls, Washington (no website found—outdated?) (Inactive)
 Kitsap Hours Bremerton, Washington (no website found—outdated?)
 Lopez Island Hours Lopez Island, Washington (no website found—outdated?) (Inactive)
 Skagit Dollars Mount Vernon, Washington (no website found—outdated?) (Inactive)
 Snohomish Diamonds Snohomish, Washington
 Sound Hours, Olympia (Inactive)
 SWEL Timebank Shoreline, Washington
 Tenino Wooden Dollars, Tenino, Washington
 Life Dollars (Started: 2004) mostly electronic with some printed bills; Bellingham and Seattle

Wisconsin
 Chamber Bucks Eau Claire, Wisconsin
 Madison Hours Madison, Wisconsin
 Milwaukee Hours Milwaukee, Wisconsin (Inactive)

Wyoming
 Goldback Statewide

See also 
Barter
Complementary currency
Local currency
List of Canadian community currencies

References

United States, List of community currencies in the